Acropora globiceps is a species of acroporid coral found in the oceanic central and western Pacific Ocean and central Indo-Pacific. It can also be found in the Great Barrier Reef, the Philippines, the Andaman Islands, Polynesia, Micronesia and the Pitcairn Islands. It was described by Dana in 1846.

Description
Acropora globiceps occurs in small digitate colonies consisting of compact branches. Its corallites are of no specific size; specimens on slopes of reefs have had tube-shaped corallites, and specimens on reef flats have had corallites built into the branches. The axial corallites are small, and the radial corallites may be ordered in rows. It is cream or blue in colour. It looks similar to Acropora gemmifera, Acropora monticulosa, Acropora retusa, and Acropora secale.

Distribution
It is classed as a vulnerable species on the IUCN Red List and it is believed that its population is decreasing; it is also listed under Appendix II of CITES. Figures of its population are unknown, but is likely to be threatened by the global reduction of coral reefs, the increase of temperature causing coral bleaching, climate change, human activity, the crown-of-thorns starfish (Acanthaster planci) and disease. It is found in the central and western Pacific Ocean and the central Indo-Pacific, including the Great Barrier Reef, the Andaman Islands, the Philippines, Polynesia, the Pitcairn Islands, and Micronesia.

Taxonomy
It was described as Madrepora globiceps by Dana in 1846.

References

Acropora
Cnidarians of the Pacific Ocean
Fauna of the Indian Ocean
Marine fauna of Asia
Marine fauna of Oceania
Fauna of Southeast Asia
Vulnerable fauna of Asia
Vulnerable fauna of Oceania
Corals described in 1846